Charlesworth may refer to:

Places 
 Charlesworth, Derbyshire, England
 Charlesworth, Edmonton, Canada

People 
 Charlesworth (surname), including a list of people with the surname
 Charlesworth Samuel (died 1980), Antiguan politician

Other uses 
 Charlesworth Bodies, coachbuilders of Coventry, England
 Charlesworth Cliffs, cliffs of Coats Land, Antarctica
 Charlesworth (TV series), a British television series broadcast in 1959